DC Breaks are a British drum and bass production duo made up of Dan Havers and Chris Page. After being discovered and nurtured by Scotland's DJ Kid, they went on to sign a record deal with RAM Records, run by the renowned producer Andy C. They have produced numerous remixes for major record labels, including artists such as Tinie Tempah, I Blame Coco, Paloma Faith, Example, Esmée Denters and Rox. In April 2017, their debut album Different Breed was released on RAM Records.

Biography
In 2010, they signed a record deal with RAM Records, run by the renowned producer Andy C. DC Breaks appeared on BBC Radio 1Xtra's mix show for Crissy Criss.

They released their first EP on Viper Recordings in May 2010 which included their well-known track "Halo", and also had their tracks featured on Andy C's Nightlife compilation series and Futurebound's compilation Acts of Madmen (2009).

They have produced numerous remixes for major record labels, including artists such as Tinie Tempah, I Blame Coco, Paloma Faith, Example, Esmée Denters and Rox.

In April 2017, their debut album Different Breed was released on RAM Records.

Discography

Albums

EPs and Singles

Other appearances

Remixes

Production credits

References

External links
 
 
 
 

British drum and bass music groups
Drum and bass duos
English dance music groups
English electronic music groups
English record producers
Record production teams
RAM Records artists